Paul Price (born 6 May 1976 in Melbourne, Victoria) is a squash player from Australia. He finished runner-up at the British Open in 2000, and reached a career-high world ranking of World No. 4 in August 2001.

External links 
 
 
 

1976 births
Living people
Australian male squash players
Commonwealth Games bronze medallists for Australia
Commonwealth Games medallists in squash
Squash players at the 2002 Commonwealth Games
Sportspeople from Melbourne
20th-century Australian people
21st-century Australian people
Medallists at the 2002 Commonwealth Games